The Baltic Triangle is a development area in Liverpool city centre. Liverpool City Council originally defined the area as being bounded by Liver Street, Park Lane, Parliament Street and Chaloner Street / Wapping. However, since the closure of Cains Brewery and its resurgence as Cains Brewery Village, Liverpool council have extended the Baltic Triangle area through to Hill Street.

The area is home to a growing number of creative and digital businesses, which sit alongside a range of independent food and drink traders; the Baltic's Camp and Furnace was named, in 2013, by the Times as one of the top 20 coolest restaurants in Britain.

History

There is much debate about the origin of the name, Baltic Triangle. It is believed it may be due to the area being the site of timber warehouses that stored wood imported from Norway. Other suggestions include that the area was home to a small but lucrative whaling industry and is named after the fishing grounds. The area is also home to the Gustav Adolf Scandinavian church. During the nineteenth century the area was settled by a large immigrant community especially from Ireland.

Liverpool City Council unveiled plans in March 2018 to increase the area the Baltic Triangle currently makes up, extending it to include the Dock Road, Sefton Street and Brunswick Station. The move was designed to stop an increase in the number of housing developments and protect space for businesses.
The council announced in January 2019 that LDA Design has been appointed to draft a Spatial Regeneration Framework to guide the future development the area. The completed report, when adopted by the council after public consultation, will be used as a Supplementary Planning Document to inform any planning applications in the area.

The Baltic Triangle Area CIC
A Community Interest Company was formed in 2010 and created the first vision manifesto for stakeholders in the area. The document outlined the core values of running a business in the Baltic Triangle and the area's mission to stay independent.

The Area Manifesto was updated in 2019 to reflect the business changes and development within district.

The CIC has been active lobbying the council and other official bodies for the necessities of a growing economy in Liverpool. These include transport, parking facilities and safe area to cross on the busy streets.

Transport
The region sits between Liverpool Central and Brunswick railway stations on Merseyrail's Northern Line. Until its closure in 1917 the area was served by Liverpool St James railway station. With the resurgence of the Baltic Triangle in the early 2010s interest grew in reopening the station. Liverpool City Region Combined Authority announced in August 2019 that they were planning to use part of a £172 million funding package for reopening the station, subject to the plans being approved.

References

Redevelopment projects in Liverpool